Klimkovice is a spa town in Ostrava-City District in the Moravian-Silesian Region of the Czech Republic. It has about 4,500 inhabitants.

Administrative parts
Villages of Hýlov, Josefovice and Václavovice are administrative parts of Klimkovice.

History
Klimkovice was probably founded by Beneš I of Kravaře, who owned the area between 1383 and 1398. The first written mention of Klimkovice is from 1386, when it was already a town.

In 1766, presence of hard coal was discovered in Klimkovice and it was the first discovery of coal in the Moravian-Silesian Region. However, it was not mined.

According to the Austrian census of 1910 the town had 2,696 inhabitants, 2,677 of whom had permanent residence there. Census asked people for their native language, 2,442 (91.2%) were Czech-speaking and 227 (8.5%) were German-speaking. Most populous religious group were Roman Catholics with 2,653 (98.4%).

Economy
Klimkovice is known for a small spa. The spa uses iodine-bromine waters with a high salt content. The spa treats diseases of the musculoskeletal system, neurological and gynecological diseases, diseases of the circulatory system, and metabolic disorders.

Notable people
Vladimír Vůjtek (born 1947), ice hockey player and coach

Twin towns – sister cities

Klimkovice is twinned with:
 Ilava, Slovakia
 Mikołów, Poland

References

External links

Cities and towns in the Czech Republic
Populated places in Ostrava-City District